Utah Buffalo Herd may refer to:

 Antelope Island Bison Herd
 Henry Mountains Bison Herd